Kristo Shehu (born 1 March 2000) is a Greek professional footballer who plays as a centre-forward.

References

External links
 Soccerway.com Profile

2000 births
Living people
Greek footballers
Greek people of Albanian descent
Greek expatriate sportspeople in Albania
Association football forwards
Albania youth international footballers
Panathinaikos F.C. players
People from Eretria
Footballers from Central Greece